Oberea artocarpi is a species of flat-faced longhorn beetle in the tribe Saperdini in the genus Oberea, discovered by Gardner in 1941.

References

A
Beetles described in 1941